Barzhuk (also Romanized as Barzhūk) is a village in Aland Rural District, Safayyeh District, Khoy County, West Azerbaijan Province, Iran. At the 2006 census, its population was 308, in 54 families.

References 

Populated places in Khoy County